The 1985 Atlanta Falcons season was the franchise’s 20th season in the National Football League (NFL). They finished last in the NFC West with a record of four wins and twelve losses.

This season marked the first time since 1972 that the Falcons played the Kansas City Chiefs, and merely the second in team history. The reason for this is that before the admission of the Texans in 2002, NFL scheduling formulas for games outside a team’s division were much more influenced by table position during the previous season. They were provisionally scheduled to play in 1976, but that game was scrapped to make room for games against the newly formed Buccaneers and Seahawks, and actually scheduled to play in 1982, but that game was cancelled by a player's strike.

Offseason

NFL Draft

Personnel

Staff

Roster

Regular season

Schedule

Game summaries

Week 10

Standings

Awards and records
Bill Fralic, Sports Illustrated NFL Rookie of the Year.

References

External links
 1985 Atlanta Falcons at Pro-Football-Reference.com

Atlanta Falcons
Atlanta Falcons seasons
Atlanta